Horace "Red" Rainey was a college football player.

University of Tennessee
Rainey was a prominent running back for the Tennessee Volunteers of the University of Tennessee.

1913
On the 6 to 7 loss to Vanderbilt in 1913, "'Red' Rainey shone for Tennessee, though he was later relegated to the side lines after a collision with one A. Sikes, Esq., otherwise known as the "Roaring Representative from Williamson." Rainey was selected All-Southern.

1914
A description of the 14 to 7 victory of Sewanee in 1914 reads, "'Red Rainey' got back into the game just at the start of the third quarter, after a month's absence from scrimmage. In spite of his bum ankle, "Red" did some good work and finished the game without calling time out. Once he intercepted a forward pass and made a good return."

References

Tennessee Volunteers football players
All-Southern college football players
American football halfbacks
American football quarterbacks